Parviturbo rehderi is a species of sea snail, a marine gastropod mollusk in the family Skeneidae.

Description
The size of the shell attains 1.7 mm.

Distribution
This species occurs in the Gulf of Mexico, the Caribbean Sea and in the Atlantic Ocean off Brazil, at depths up to 40 m.

References

 Pilsbry H.A. & McGinty T.L. (1945). "Cyclostrematidae" and Vitrinellidae of Florida. I. Nautilus, 59(1): 1-13, pl. 1-2; II, Nautilus, 59(2): 52-60, pl. 6

External links
 

rehderi
Gastropods described in 1945